Mesud Mohammed Mussa (born 18 February 1990) is an Ethiopian professional footballer who plays as an midfielder for Ethiopian Premier League club Adama City and the Ethiopia national team.

International career
Mohammed made his international debut with the Ethiopia national team in a 2–1 2010 FIFA World Cup qualification loss to Rwanda on 8 June 2008.

Honours
Ethiopian Coffee
Ethiopian Premier League: 2010–11

References

External links
 
 

1990 births
Living people
Sportspeople from Addis Ababa
Ethiopian footballers
Ethiopia international footballers
Ethiopian Premier League players
Association football midfielders
EEPCO F.C. players
Ethiopian Coffee S.C. players
Jimma Aba Jifar F.C. players
2021 Africa Cup of Nations players
Ethiopia A' international footballers
2022 African Nations Championship players